John Davey (born June 25, 1939) is a retired American actor. He is best known for portraying Captain Marvel on the Shazam! television series in the mid-1970s after Jackson Bostwick was dismissed in the early part of the second season.

Early life, family and education
Davey was raised in Winnemucca, Nevada, the only city in Humboldt County, Nevada. He graduated from Humboldt County High School in 1957.

Career
Davey was in the US Marine Corps from September 3, 1957, to October 1961. He was also a heavyweight boxer, including work as a sparring partner for Joe Frazier.

Davey performed in numerous television series, including Perry Mason, The Rockford Files, and Max Headroom. Like many Hollywood actors, he would appear in minor roles as different characters in specific episodes of the same series; he appeared in The Rockford Files in six episodes over three years this way, and in four episodes of Barnaby Jones this way. He acted in many TV movies.

Davey's most prominent performances were in his leading role as the superhero character Captain Marvel on the television series Shazam!. The show was created and broadcast during the Saturday morning timeslot, which was typically for children's programming. Davey was the second actor to play the role on the series. (The original actor for the role, Jackson Bostwick, was fired by the show's producers who believed Bostwick did not appear for filming as an attempt to increase his salary, although Bostwick explained he was receiving medical treatment for injuries which occurred while performing stunts during filming of Shazam. Bostwick successfully litigated against Filmation Associates, which was forced to pay him for the remainder of his contract, plus residuals, including the entire second season.) Davey has recalled that the producers were hastily seeking to replace Bostwick. As Captain Marvel, Davey appeared in three episodes of Isis, a companion TV series.

Personal life
Davey has a son, Tomasso Gambino (born on May 23, 1967), a grandson Kian Seiter and granddaughter Kylee Rice.

Screen roles

References

External links
 
 John Davey on Facebook

1939 births
20th-century American male actors
American male film actors
American male television actors
Heavyweight boxers
Living people
Male actors from Nevada
Military personnel from Nevada
People from Winnemucca, Nevada
United States Marines